India does not recognise registered marriage or civil unions for same-sex couples, though same-sex couples can attain rights and benefits as a live-in couple (anagolous to cohabitation) as per a Supreme Court of India judgement in August 2022.

While it does not recognise same-sex marriage or civil unions, the vast majority of heterosexual marriages are not registered with government and common law marriage based on traditional customs remains the dominant form of marriage. Hindu priests have been conducting same-sex marriage ceremonies in India and overseas, and hundreds of same-sex marriages among Hindus in India have been reported since at least the late 1980s through common law marriage. 

India does not possess a unified marriage law, and as such every citizen has the right to choose which law will apply to them based on their community or religion. Although marriage is legislated at the federal level, the existence of multiple marriage laws complicates the issue.

Background
Since 1987, when the national press reported the story of two policewomen who married each other by Hindu rites in central India, the press has reported many same-sex marriages, all over the country, mostly between lower middle-class young women in small towns and rural areas, who have no contact with any gay movement. Family reactions range from support to disapproval to violent persecution. While police generally harass such couples, Indian courts have uniformly upheld their right, as adults, to live with whomever they wish. In recent years, some of these couples have appeared on television as well.

There have also been numerous joint suicides by same-sex couples, mostly female (different-sex couples also resort to suicide or to elopement and religious marriage when their families oppose their unions).

In 2000, author Ruth Vanita in her book "Same-Sex Love in India: Readings from Literature and History" analysed dozens of such marriages and suicides that had taken place over the past three decades, and explored their legal, religious and historical aspects. She argued that many of the marriages can arguably be considered legally valid, as under the Hindu Marriage Act, 1955 any marriage between two Hindus performed according to the customs prevalent in the community of one of the two partners is legally valid. No license is required to marry, and most heterosexual Hindu marriages in India today are performed by religious rites alone, without a marriage license and are never registered with the state. Most couples seek the validation of family and community, and several female couples in rural areas and small towns have received this validation. Since 2017, the press has reported several same-sex marriage ceremonies in India, namely in Yavatmal, Agra, Thrissur, and Hyderabad.

There have also been a couple of high-profile celebrity same-sex civil partnerships, such as the civil union of designer Wendell Rodricks with his French partner Jerome Marrel conducted under French law in Goa in 2002.

A case before the Madras High Court opinioned same-sex marriage within historical Hinduism, that homosexual acts are not forbidded under the Act, and that marriage is a fundamental constitutional right. If literally interpreted, the terms "groom" and "bride" may be viewed as referring to narrow definitions based on genders ("male" and "female"). However, the Hindu Marriage Act was a codification of the ancient Sastrik law by the colonial government for the purpose of regulating issues such as divorce. Application of the "mischief rule" in this situation allows homosexual marriage to be allowed under the current reading of the Hindu Marriage Act, as what "the statute aims at relieving is the regulation of marriage, and not that two same-sex individuals could marry each other. The Act is a codifying statute, and not a penal or disabling statute" and that it was improperly codified.

In August 2022 the Supreme Court of India provided live-in couples including homosexual couples with equal rights to married couples. This offers some semblance of equality in a country where the vast majority of Hindu marriages are not registered with government.

There are currently around six petitions pending at the High Court of Delhi asking for recognition of their marriages under the Hindu Marriage Act. The verdict will be delivered on the 24th April 2023.

Live-in relationships and other forms of partnership

Since August 2022, Indian LGBTQ can attain rights and benefits equal to married couples as a live-in couple (anagolous to cohabitation) as per a supreme court judgement, which offers some sembience of equality in a country where the vast majority of marriages are not registered with government.

Couples in "live-in relationships" are not married to each other but live together as a cohabiting couple. Live-in relationships tend to be viewed by Indian society as taboo, but have become gradually more common among the younger population in light of the slow decline of arranged marriages. Unlike marriages, live-in relationships are not regulated by law. No law lays down the rights, benefits and commitments for parties in a live-in relationship. However, court judgments and various pieces of legislation offer various rights to such couples. The Protection of Women from Domestic Violence Act, 2005 grants domestic violence protections to women who live in a "relationship in the nature of marriage". Courts have interpreted this expression as covering live-in relationships. Following amendments in the early 2000s, the term "wife" under the Criminal Procedure Code, 1973 includes women who have been in live-in relationships for a "sensible period of time" for the purpose of alimony.

In S. Khushboo v. Kanniammal in 2010, the Supreme Court held that a live-in relationship comes within the ambit of the right to life under Article 21 of the Constitution of India. The court further held that live-in relationships are permissible and the act of two people living together cannot be considered illegal or unlawful. On 6 May 2018, the Supreme Court ruled that a 20-year-old Malayali woman, whose marriage had been annulled, could choose whom she wanted to live with. The court ruled that "an adult couple has a right to live together without marriage". The Supreme Court has held that certain criteria have to be met for a live-in relationship to be recognised; this includes both parties "[being] of legal age to marry or should be qualified to enter into a legal marriage" and they "must have voluntarily cohabited and held themselves out to the world as being akin to spouses for a significant period of time". In 2015, the court ruled in Dhannulal v. Ganeshram that couples living in a live-in relationship will be presumed legally married if they have been living together for a long period of time. The court also added that a woman in such a relationship is eligible to inherit the property of her deceased partner. Court rulings have also held that children born within a live-in relationship will not be considered illegitimate.

It is unknown how these various rights and benefits apply to same-sex couples, for whom live-in relationships are the only type of union recognised by law to some degree. In June 2020, the Uttarakhand High Court ruled that live-in relationships between same-sex couples are not unlawful; "It is a fundamental right which is guaranteed to a person under article 21 of the Constitution of India, which is wide enough to protect an inherent right of self determination with regards to one's identity and freedom of choice with regards to the sexual orientation of choice of the partner". The Orissa High Court ruled in August 2020 that same-sex live-in relationships are recognised under the constitutional right to life and equality. The court held that women in same-sex live-in relationships are protected under the 2005 domestic violence law similarly to different-sex cohabiting couples. In July 2020, the Punjab and Haryana High Court ruled that same-sex couples are entitled to live-in relationships and protection of their lives and liberty as envisaged under Article 21 of the Constitution of India.

In June 2020, a lesbian couple from Mahisagar district, Gujarat filed a petition with the Gujarat High Court seeking police protection from their families and recognition of their right to cohabitation. The couple had entered a "friendship agreement" (મૈત્રી કરાર, maitri karar) as a way to legitimise their relationship; "like in case of a marital union, it had details on property ownership, inheritance and maintenance, in case of separation."  The High Court granted their petition on 23 July 2020 and ordered the Mahisagar police to give protection to the couple. Maya Sharma, an activist with the Vikalp Women's Group, said "such contracts in court cases [are used] in which one of the partners' parents were forcing marriage upon them. It has helped us get judgements in our favour." The first maitri karar between a same-sex couple is believed to have occurred in 1987 in Chhota Udaipur district. A similar custom called Nata Pratha (नाता प्रथा) is practiced in parts of Rajasthan and Madhya Pradesh.

Same-sex marriage
India has traditionally identified same-sex unions to be a trans-rooted alien culture-bound syndrome. Hence, LGBT groups are mostly working for a step-by-step approach required to tackle all the challenges faced by LGBT citizens in India. The previous focuses of these groups were to repeal Section 377 of the Indian Penal Code and to enact non-discrimination laws. Nevertheless, LGBT rights groups are optimistic and are working on winning the right to same-sex marriage, inspired by the progress achieved in several Western countries. In April 2014, Medha Patkar of the Aam Aadmi Party said that her party supports same-sex marriage.

A single case of legal recognition of a same-sex marriage was granted by the Punjab and Haryana High Court in 2011. The couple held a marriage ceremony in Gurgaon after signing an affidavit asserting that they meet all of the requirements of a legal marriage.

On 2 April 2022, MP Supriya Sule introduced a private member's bill to legalize same-sex marriages under the Special Marriage Act, 1954.

Federal marriage laws
The following acts cover India's marriage laws:
 The Indian Christian Marriage Act, 1872: regulates the marriage and divorce of Indian Christians. An ordained minister of a church or a marriage registrar may conduct marriages under the Act.
 Special Marriage Act, 1954: provides for marriage for all Indian citizens regardless of the religion of either party. Marriages contracted under this Act are registered with the state as a civil contract. The Act applies to partners of all religions or with no religious beliefs as well as interfaith couples.

 Hindu Marriage Act, 1955: governs matters of marriage, separation and divorce of Hindus according to Hindu custom and rites.
 Parsi Marriage and Divorce Act, 1936: regulates marriage and divorce for Parsis under Zoroastrian rites.
 Anand Marriage Act, 1909: governs marriage for Sikhs.
 Muslim Personal Law (Shariat) Application Act, 1937: deals with marriage, succession and inheritance among Muslims.

On 1 April 2022, MP Supriya Sule from the Nationalist Congress Party introduced a bill to the Lok Sabha to legalise same-sex marriage under the Special Marriage Act. The proposal would amend various sections of the Act to provide same-sex couples with the same legal rights as opposite-sex couples. The bill would fix the marriageable age at 21 for male couples and at 18 for lesbian couples.

State and territory laws
Further complicating matters, the states and union territories of India have their own laws with regards to the registration of marriages and marriages contracted under indigenous customs and rites. In February 2006, the Supreme Court ruled in Smt. Seema v. Ashwani Kumar that the states and union territories were obliged to register all marriages performed under the federal laws. The court's ruling was expected to reduce instances of child marriages, bigamy, cases of domestic violence and unlawful abandonment.

In August 2009, Governor Surjit Singh Barnala of Tamil Nadu assented The Tamil Nadu Registration of Marriages Act, 2009, which complied with the Supreme Court ruling. The Act defines marriage as "all marriages performed by persons belonging to any caste or religion under any law for the time being in force, or as per any custom or usage in any form or manner and also includes remarriage". Laws were also passed in other states: the Kerala Registration of Marriages (Common) Rules, 2008 in Kerala, the Andhra Pradesh Compulsory Registration of Marriages Act, 2002 in Andhra Pradesh, the Karnataka Marriage (Registration and Miscellaneous Provisions) Rules, 2006 in Karnataka, the Gujarat Registration of Marriages Act, 2006 in Gujarat, the Manipur Compulsory Registration of Marriages Act, 2008 in Manipur, etc.

The state of Goa is the only state to have a unified marriage law. Every citizen is bound to the same law regardless of their religion. However, the Goa Civil Code, largely based on Portuguese civil law, defines marriage as a "perpetual contract made between two persons of different sex with the purpose of legitimately constituting a family". The code is also applicable to the union territory of Dadra and Nagar Haveli and Daman and Diu.

The Mizo Marriage, Divorce and Inheritance of Property Act, 2014, enacted by the Mizoram Legislative Assembly, provides for marriage, divorce and inheritance rules among the Mizo people, allowing marriages performed under Mizo customs to be legally recognised in the state. The Act defines marriage as "a union of a man and a woman who are both major as husband and wife".

Uniform Civil Code
In 2017, a draft of a Uniform Civil Code to legalise same-sex marriage was published. Under the proposed code, marriage was defined as "the legal union as prescribed under this Act of a man with a woman, a man with another man, a woman with another woman, a transgender with another transgender or a transgender with a man or a woman". A partnership was similarly defined as the "living together of a man with a woman, a man with another man, a woman with another woman, a transgender with another transgender or a transgender with a man or a woman". It also provided that any two persons who have been in a partnership for more than two years shall have the same rights and obligations as married couples, and mandated that all marriages be registered with the state. In addition, the draft stated that "all married couples and couples in a partnership are entitled to adopt a child. The sexual orientation of the married couple or the partners are not to be a bar to their right to adoption. Non-heterosexual couples will be equally entitled to adopt a child." Finally, the code provided for the repeal of all of India's marriage-related laws (the Hindu Marriage Act, the Hindu Succession Act, the Muslim Personal Law (Shariat) Application Act, The Indian Christian Marriage Act, among others). The draft was submitted to the Law Commission of India for consideration.

Whether India should adopt a Uniform Civil Code is a matter of ongoing political debate. The Bharatiya Janata Party (BJP) supports a Uniform Civil Code and was the first party in India to do so. The Law Commission began soliciting public views and requests on the issue on 19 March 2018, and later extended the deadline for opinions to 6 May 2018. Muslim groups oppose a uniform civil code because such a code would ban triple talaq, polygamy and would not be based on Sharia law, unlike the current Muslim personal law, which governs Indian Muslims. The Law Commission of India stated on 31 August 2018 that a Uniform Civil Code is "neither necessary nor desirable at this stage" in a 185-page consultation paper. In February 2020, Union Minister Ravi Shankar Prasad said that "presently there is no proposal to legalise same-sex marriage", adding that the Union Government was not considering the issue.

Legal challenges
Following the Supreme Court of India's ruling in Navtej Singh Johar v. Union of India in September 2018, decriminalising homosexuality in India, several lawsuits have been filed across the country to address the marriage rights of Indian same-sex couples. The Madras High Court ruled in April 2019 that transgender women are allowed to marry under the Hindu Marriage Act, 1955.

In July 2019, the Delhi High Court dismissed a legal challenge brought forward by advocates Tajinder Singh and Anurag Chauhan seeking directions to make rules and regulations to recognise same-sex marriages under the Hindu Marriage Act, 1955. In April 2022, the Allahabad High Court similarly dismissed a case brought by a Hindu lesbian couple who wished to marry under the Act. The court also dismissed a habeas corpus claim brought by the mother of one of the women.

In 2019, two women from Hamirpur, Uttar Pradesh tried to get their relationship recognised as a marriage at the local registrar's office, who refused citing lack of relevant legal provisions. The couple's lawyer, Daya Shankar Tiwari, said they would challenge the registrar's decision. In January 2020, Sonu MS and Nikesh Pushkaran, filed a lawsuit in the Kerala High Court, arguing that preventing them from getting married under the Special Marriage Act violates the principle of equality, non-arbitrariness, non-discrimination, individual dignity and personal autonomy under Articles 14, 15(1), 19(1)(a) and 21 of the Constitution of India.

Shakti Vahini v. Union of India (2018)
In March 2018, the Indian Supreme Court, in the case of Shakti Vahini v. Union of India, held that an adult has the fundamental right to marry a person of their choice. In this case, which centred on the practice of honour killings, most often performed by family members when a person chooses to marry outside of their caste or religious group, the court ruled that "the choice of an individual is an inextricable part of dignity, for dignity cannot be thought of where there is erosion of choice. True it is, the same is bound by the principle of constitutional limitation but in the absence of such limitation, none, we mean, no one shall be permitted to interfere in the fructification of the said choice. If the right to express one's own choice is obstructed, it would be extremely difficult to think of dignity in its sanctified completeness." LGBT activists feel that a joint reading of Shakti Vahini and Navtej Singh Johar, could yield the recognition of same-sex unions within the Special Marriage Act, 1954.

Proceedings in the Delhi High Court (2020–2022)
Petitioners Abhijit Iyer Mitra, Gopi Shankar Madurai, Giti Thadani and G. Oorvasi filed Abhijit Iyer Mitra & Ors v. Union of India in the Delhi High Court in 2020 asserting a right to marriage for same-sex couples under the Hindu Marriage Act, 1955 (HMA). "[S]aid Act does not distinguish between heterosexual and homosexual marriage if one were to go by how it has been worded. It very clearly states that marriage can indeed be solemnised between 'any two Hindus'. In this view of the matter, it can be stated that it is against the constitutional mandate of non-arbitrariness if the said right is not extended to homosexual apart from heterosexual couples," the petition, represented by lawyers Raghav Awasthi and Mukesh Sharma, said. The petition seeks a declaration stating that Section 5 of the HMA does not distinguish between homosexual and heterosexual couples and the right of same-sex couples to marry should be recognised under the Act. In November 2020, the Delhi High Court asked the Union Government to file an official response to the petition.

In October 2020, a lesbian couple, medical practitioners Kavita Arora and Ankita Khanna, filed a lawsuit, Dr Kavita Arora & Anr v. Union of India, with the Delhi High Court seeking a declaration that the Special Marriage Act, 1954 (SMA) ought to apply to couples irrespective of gender and sexual orientation. The petitioners, represented by senior advocate Maneka Guruswamy and lawyers Arundhati Katju, Govind Manoharan and Surabhi Dhar, contend that the SMA in denying recognition of same-sex marriages constitutes an infringement of Articles 14, 15, 19 and 21 of the Indian Constitution. The couple asserts that Articles 19 and 21 of the Constitution of India protect the right to marry a person of one's choice, and this right should apply to same-sex couples, just as it does to opposite-sex couples. The petitioners also contend that the exclusion of same-sex marriage from the SMA violates Article 14 and 15 of the Constitution pursuant to the Supreme Court's decision in Navtej Singh Johar v. Union of India that sexual orientation and gender identity are protected under the fundamental right of equality. Because they are unable to marry, the couple cannot own a house together, open a bank account or access family life insurance. The High Court sought responses from the Union Government on the plea.

In Vaibhav Jain & Anr v. Union of India, two gay men, Vaibhav Jain and Parag Vijay Mehta, who married in Washington, D.C. in 2017, contend that the Foreign Marriage Act, 1969 should be perused to apply to same-sex relationships and is unconstitutional to the extent that it does not recognise the same. The High Court asked the Union Government and the Consulate General of India in New York City to respond to the petition.

 The Delhi High Court set a hearing for all three petitions on 8 January 2021. On that day, Justices Rajiv Sahai Endlaw and Sanjeev Narula granted "one last opportunity" to the Union Government to file official responses to the three petitions. 
 The court scheduled further deliberations for 25 February 2021. The Union Government is represented by Solicitor General Tushar Mehta. On 25 February, the government asked the Delhi High Court to dismiss the cases, arguing in its response that marriage is based on "age-old customs, rituals, practices, cultural ethos and societal values" and that there thus exists a "legitimate state interest" in preventing same-sex couples from marrying. 
 A fourth petition, Udit Sood and Ors. v. Union of India and Anr, was filed in February 2021. The petitioners, three men and one woman, represented by advocates Meghna Mishra and Tahira Karanjawala, are asking the court to declare that the SMA applies to any two persons who wish to marry regardless of sex. Justices Rajiv Sahai Endlaw and Amit Bansal asked the government to respond to the petition. 
 On 24 May 2021, the government asked the court to delay deliberations on the four petitions, stating that "nobody is dying because of the lack of marriage registration" and that the government's focus were on "urgent and immediate" pandemic-related issues. 
 A fifth petition, Joydeep Sengupta v. Union of India & Ors, was filed by Joydeep Sengupta, an Overseas Citizen of India (OCI), and his American partner Russell Blaine Stephens in July 2021. The couple argues that the Citizenship Act, 1955 does not distinguish between different-sex and same-sex spouses and that the same-sex spouse of an OCI should be eligible to apply for an OCI card. The plea further claims that the Foreign Marriage Act violates Articles 14 and 21 of the Constitution of India in excluding the recognition of foreign same-sex marriages. 
 On 6 July 2021, the division bench of Chief Justice Dhirubhai Naranbhai Patel and Justice Jyoti Singh listed the petitions for hearing on 27 August.
 On 25 October 2021, the High Court granted time for the petitioners to file replies and rejoinders to the government's arguments. It set a final hearing for 30 November. Instead, that day, advocates representing the couples asked that the proceedings be live streamed, arguing that "the issue at hand before this [Honourable Court] is of such magnitude and ramification, that live streaming of the said proceedings shall not only have a larger outreach but also help in spreading awareness".
 On 31 March 2022, Acting Chief Justice Vipin Sanghi and Justice Navin Chawla ordered the government to respond within two weeks to the application seeking live streaming of the proceedings. 
 In May 2022, in an affidavit, the government opposed live-streaming the proceedings, stating that the "applicants were attempting to create a dramatic impression of the proceedings before the court and to win sympathy", adding that the matter was not of "national importance".The next hearing was scheduled for 17 May 2022 
 On 17 May 2022, the court objected to the government's "highly objectionable comments"; the government said it would file a new response. Advocates representing the couples said the government's statements demean the rights of same-sex couples, "I am troubled that the government of India should use words like sympathy, hallucination, you are sensationalising. You may agree or disagree on live streaming but please don’t trivialise and demean the people who have struggled for years till the constitution bench of the apex court recognised their rights", said senior advocate Neeraj Kishan Kaul. The next hearing was scheduled for 20 August 2022.
 On 20 August, the court deferred the hearing again to 6 December due to a paucity of court time on that day.

Proceedings before the Supreme Court of India (2022–present)

On 25 November 2022, the Supreme Court of India agreed to hear the case that could legalize same-sex marriages, which will begin after hearing the petitions seeking transfer of nine petitions which is already pending before the Kerala and Delhi High Courts dealing with the same issue directly to the Supreme Court for a uniform ruling. The matter is scheduled to be heard by the Supreme Court on January 6, 2023. 

On December 19, 2022, Sushil Modi, a  prominent BJP lawmaker, told Parliament that "India is the country of 1.4 billion people and two judges cannot just sit in a room and decide on such a socially significant subject. Instead, there should be a debate in Parliament as well as the society at large" he added.

On January 6, 2023, Supreme Court heard the matter listed earlier. After that the three judges bench led by The Chief Justice of India Chandrachud ordered that all the petitions pending before India's High Courts be transferred to the Supreme Court, and listed the petitions for 13 March 2023.

Citing the seminal importance of this matter and invoking Article 145(3) of the Constitution, on March 13, the Supreme Court referred the case to a five-judge Constitution bench, which will be hearing the case from April 18, 2023. The hearing is expected to be livestreamed.

Public opinion
According to a 2015 Ipsos poll, 29% of Indians supported same-sex marriage, while 18% supported other forms of legal recognition. Among the 23 countries polled, India had the fifth lowest support for same-sex marriage, in front of only South Korea (27%), Turkey (27%), Poland (21%) and Russia (11%).

According to a 2016 poll by the International Lesbian, Gay, Bisexual, Trans and Intersex Association, 35% of Indian people were in favour of legalising same-sex marriage, while 35% were opposed. A September–October 2016 survey by the Varkey Foundation found that support for same-sex marriage was higher among 18 to 21-year-olds at 53%.

A 2019 poll by Mood of the Nation (MOTN) found that 24% of Indians agreed with same-sex marriages, while 62% disagreed and 14% were undecided.

A May 2021 Ipsos poll showed that 44% of Indians supported same-sex marriage, 14% supported civil unions but not marriage, while 18% were opposed to all legal recognition for same-sex couples, and 24% were undecided.

See also
 LGBT rights in India
 S Sushma v. Commissioner of Police
 Sultana Mirza v. State of Uttar Pradesh

Notes

References